1st May is a rural locality (a settlement) and the administrative center of Pervomayskoye Rural Settlement of Konakovsky District, Russia. The population was 694 as of 2008.

Geography 
The settlement is located on the Soz River, 45 km north of Konakovo (the district's administrative centre) by road. Karpovskoye is the nearest rural locality.

Streets 
 s/t Zarya Territoriya

References

External links 
 1 May on gorod-tver.ru

Rural localities in Konakovsky District